Franco Solinas (19 January 1927 - 14 September 1982) was an Italian writer and screenwriter. He is best known for the screenplay of The Battle of Algiers, which was nominated for three Academy Awards. He also wrote the 1969 historical drama ¡Queimada!, starring Marlon Brando. Both films were directed by Gillo Pontecorvo.

Solinas is also credited with writing several notable Zapata westerns, including Tepepa, The Mercenary, A Bullet for the General, and The Big Gundown.

References

External links
 

1927 births
1982 deaths
People from Cagliari
People from Sardinia
20th-century Italian screenwriters
Italian male screenwriters
20th-century Italian male writers